Layia gaillardioides is a species of flowering plant in the family Asteraceae known by the common name woodland tidytips.

It is endemic to California, where it grows on the coastline and in the coastal mountain ranges in the northern and central parts of the state. It is often found on serpentine soils.

Description
This is an aromatic annual herb producing an erect stem up to a meter-3 feet tall coated in dark glandular hairs. The leaves are linear or lance-shaped, and the lower ones are lobed or toothed and approach 10 centimeters in maximum length.

The flower head has a nearly rounded base of fuzzy green phyllaries. It opens into a face fringed with bright yellow ray florets which are sometimes tipped with white, and a center of disc florets with purple anthers. The fruit is an achene; fruits on the disc florets often have a thick pappus of white or brown bristles.

References

External links
Jepson Manual Treatment
USDA Plants Profile
Photo gallery

gaillardioides
Endemic flora of California
Natural history of the California chaparral and woodlands
Natural history of the California Coast Ranges
Endemic flora of the San Francisco Bay Area
Flora without expected TNC conservation status